Agricultural equipment is any kind of machinery used on a farm to help with farming. The best-known example of this kind is the tractor.

Tractor and power

Tractor / Two-wheel tractor
Tracked tractor / Caterpillar tractor

Soil cultivation

Cultipacker
Cultivator (of two main variations)
 Dragged teeth (also called shanks) that pierce the soil.  
 Rotary motion of disks or teeth.  Examples are: Power tiller / Rotary tiller / Rototiller / Bedtiller / Mulch tiller / Rotavator
Harrow (e.g. Spike harrow, Drag harrow, Disk harrow)
Land imprinter
Plow or plough {various specialized types}
Roller

 Stone / Rock / Debris removal implement (e.g. Destoner, Rock windrower / rock rake, Stone picker / picker)
Strip till toolbar (and a variation
 called Zone till subsoiler)
Subsoiler

Planting

 Planter
 Seed-counting machine
 Seed drill (box drill, air drill)
 Trowel

Fertilizers and pesticides dispenser

Liquid manure/slurry spreader and Liquid manure fertilizer spreader (e.g. slurry tanker or Terragator)
Dry Manure spreader (e.g. Terragator)
Sprayer

Irrigation

Drip irrigation/micro spray heads
Sprinkler system 
Center pivot irrigation
Hydroponics

Produce sorter

 Blemish sorter.
 Colour sorter
 Density Sorter
 Diameter sorter
 Internal/taste sorter
 Shape sorter
 Weight sorter

Harvesting / post-harvest processing

Buckrake—for silage making
Grain cart (with built in grain auger)
Conveyor belt
Cotton picker
Farm truck
Grain dryer
Harvestor / harvester built for harvesting specific crops. (e.g. Bean harvester, Beet harvester, Carrot harvester, Combine (grain) harvester / Stripper, Header, Corn harvester, Forage or silage harvester, Grape harvester, Over-the-row mechanical harvester for harvesting apples, Potato harvester, Potato spinner/digger which is becoming obsolete, and Sugarcane harvester. Variations of harvesters are stripper cleaners and stripper loaders.

 Multi crop Harvester 
Haulm topper
Mechanical tree shaker and other orchard equipment
Mower
Rake
Reaper-binder (now mostly replaced by the swather)
Rice huller
Swather (more common in the northern United States and Canada)
Wagon (and variations of gravity wagons, trailers—e.g. silage trailers, grain hopper trailers and lighter, two-wheeled carts)

Hand harvesting

Flail
Sickle (hand-held)
Winnower (mechanized into the winnowing machine, which has been replaced by the combine harvester

Hay making

Bale lifter (also called Bale mover or Bale spike)
Bale wrapper
Baler
Hay rake
Hay tedder
Loader wagon / self-loading wagon – used in Europe, but not common in USA
Mower-conditioners

Hand hay tool
Hay fork
Wooden rake

Loading

Backhoe/backhoe loader
Front end loader
Skid-steer loader
Telescopic handler
Tractor-mounted forklift

Milking

Bulk tank
Milking machine
Milking pipeline

Animal Feeding
Grinder-mixer

Other

Agricultural robots
Allen Scythe
Aquatic weed harvester
Bale splitter
Chillcuring
Conveyor analyzer
Feed grinder
Hedge cutter
Hedge trimmer
Livestock trailer
Mixer-wagon (diet feeder)
Mulching machine
Post driver (and hand tool)
Shear Grab (and power link box)
Trailer
Yard scraper

Obsolete farm machinery

Steam-powered:

Portable engine
Stationary steam engine
Threshing machine (replaced by the combine harvester)
Traction engine (e.g. Agricultural engine, Ploughing engine, Steam tractor)

Other:

Drag harrow
Hog oiler
Reaper (replaced by the Stripper and Reaper-binder)
Winnowing machine/Winnowing-fan

External links 

Machinery